Des Morrison (born 1 February 1950) is a Jamaican/British professional light welter/welter/light middleweight boxer of the 1970s and 1980s who won the British Boxing Board of Control Southern (England) Area welterweight title, BBBofC British light welterweight title, and Commonwealth light welterweight title, and was a challenger for the BBBofC British light welterweight title against; Joey Singleton, Colin Powers, and Clinton McKenzie, and Commonwealth light welterweight title against Obisia Nwankpa, his professional fighting weight varied from , i.e. light welterweight to , i.e. light middleweight.

References

External links

Image - Des Morrison

1950 births
Jamaican male boxers
Light-middleweight boxers
Light-welterweight boxers
Place of birth missing (living people)
Super-featherweight boxers
Welterweight boxers
Living people
British male boxers
Jamaican emigrants to the United Kingdom
People from Spanish Town